Lenny DeRose is a studio engineer and music producer who has been credited on several recordings dating back to the early 1980s.

As an engineer, he has been credited for his work on several film soundtracks, including Naked in New York, 9½ Weeks, among others. DeRose has been nominated for several Juno Awards for his work, and has produced every recording released by The Philosopher Kings. In 1995, he received the Recording Engineer of the Year award for his work with the band. Releases for 2012 include Elise LeGrow, The Tragically Hip, Metric, Hey Ocean!, Walk Off the Earth, Whosarmy, and The Barenaked Ladies.

Performers
DeRose has worked with numerous acts over the past quarter-century, across an assortment of genres. Performers he has credited for collaborating with include (but not limited to):

 Alice Cooper — Engineer
 Helix — Assistant engineer
 Figgy Duff — Mixing
 Honeymoon Suite — Engineer
 Hanoi Rocks — Engineer, remixing
 Strange Advance — Engineer
 Haywire — Engineer
 Lee Aaron — Engineer, mixing
 The Partland Brothers — Engineer, mixing
 Pukka Orchestra — Mixing
 Strange Advance — Engineer, mixing
 Exchange — Mixing
 The Nylons — Mixing
 Lisa Dal Bello — Engineer, mixing
 Dan Hill — Engineer, mixing
 Liona Boyd — Engineer, mixing
 Acid Test — Producer, engineer, mixing
 John James — Engineer, mixing
 Long John Baldry — Engineer
 Caramel — Mixing, producer, engineer
 Colin Linden — Engineer, mixing
 Prozzäk — Producer, engineer, mixing
 Dunk — Engineer, mixing
 Edwin — Engineer
 The Bourbon Tabernacle Choir — Engineer, recording
 58 — Engineer
 Ebony Tears — Vocals
 Celine Dion — Engineer
 54-40 — Mixing
 The Kings — Engineer
 Junkhouse — Producer, mastering
 Fefe Dobson — Mixing
 Mötley Crüe — Engineer
 Max Webster — Engineer
 Melissa O'Neil — Mixing
 Cats Can Fly — Producer
 Dalbello — Production assistance, mixing
 B4-4 — Producer

References

External links
1995 Juno Awards nominees and winners

Canadian record producers
Juno Award for Recording Engineer of the Year winners
Living people
Year of birth missing (living people)